Life After Love is a Canadian romantic comedy film, directed by Gabriel Pelletier and released in 2000. The film stars Michel Côté as Gilles, a man who is desperately trying to win back the love of his ex-wife Sophie (Sylvie Léonard) after she leaves him for another man.

The film received two Genie Award nominations at the 21st Genie Awards, for Best Supporting Actor (Patrick Huard) and Best Costume Design (Denis Sperdouklis). It received five Prix Jutra nominations at the 3rd Jutra Awards, for Best Film, Best Actor (Côté), Best Supporting Actor (Huard), Best Supporting Actress (Guylaine Tremblay) and Best Screenplay (Ken Scott), as well as winning the Billet d'or as the year's top-grossing Quebec film.

References

External links
 

2000 films
Canadian romantic comedy films
Films shot in Quebec
Films set in Quebec
Films directed by Gabriel Pelletier
2000s French-language films
French-language Canadian films
2000s Canadian films